Phar-Mor (stylized as ) was a United States chain of discount drug stores, based in Youngstown, Ohio, and founded by Michael "Mickey" Monus and  David Shapira in 1982. Some of its stores used the names Pharmhouse and Rx Place (purchased in the mid-1990s from the F.W. Woolworth Company). Low prices were advertised to bring in a large volume of sales with the slogans "Phar-Mor power buying gives you Phar-Mor buying power" and "Phar-Mor For Less." Another common slogan in their TV commercials was "Power buying saves: Save at Phar-Mor."

In 1996, the Green Bay, Wisconsin-based regional discount store chain ShopKo announced a plan to merge with Phar-Mor, but withdrew from the plan a year later, citing irreconcilable differences.

Business model 
Phar-Mor's business model was based on selling a large quantity of merchandise with a very small profit margin. Many products were shipped via direct store delivery, but some were shipped through Tamco warehouses, which Phar-Mor later purchased.

Sam Walton once called Monus the only retailer that he feared, since he couldn't understand how Phar-Mor grew so rapidly in a short time.

Bankruptcy
In 1992, when the company had grown to over 300 stores and 25,000 employees, Monus and his CFO Patrick Finn were accused of embezzlement: they had allegedly hidden losses and moved about $10 million from Phar-Mor to the World Basketball League that Monus had founded.  Based on deceptive data and inventory, Phar-Mor borrowed millions, ostensibly to finance its unusually rapid growth. In actuality, this infusion of cash was necessary to pay off suppliers. As a result, Phar-Mor had to file for bankruptcy protection, closed 55 stores and laid off 5,000 employees. Finn testified against Monus and received 33 months in prison. Monus' first trial ended in a hung jury in 1994; he was convicted at the second trial on 107 federal counts, mostly related to fraud, and sentenced to 17 years and 7 months in federal prison. Prosecutors estimated that the total loss to all investors exceeded $1 billion. The sentence was appealed and later reduced to nine years.

Several investors in Phar-Mor filed a civil suit against the company's auditors, Coopers & Lybrand. A jury decided in 1996 that the accountants committed common law and federal securities law fraud by falsely representing they had performed GAAS audits when in fact they had failed to do so.

Phar-Mor emerged from bankruptcy protection in January 1995 with 143 stores remaining, only to be hit hard once again by competition from other large retailers, such as Wal-Mart and Target, which began opening new stores with pharmacies. Phar-Mor, unable to compete, was forced into bankruptcy for the second time in September 2001, only about six and a half years after it had emerged from its prior three-year-long bankruptcy. The company was delisted from the NASDAQ Stock Market on October 10, 2001.

Phar-Mor became weaker during its last years of business. The company tried to return to its Power Buying concept before it had filed for bankruptcy, but to no avail. Without Power Buying, Phar-Mor found itself directly competing with CVS and Walgreens, and lost out because of other chains' convenient locations. Phar-Mor's second bankruptcy was eventually to result in its total liquidation.

In July 2002, a judge in Youngstown approved the sale of Phar-Mor Inc.'s $141 million in assets and inventory. Going-out-of-business sales began at the pharmacy chain's remaining 73 stores. Liquidation of Phar-Mor's inventory was handled by The Ozer Group of Needham, Massachusetts and Hilco Merchant Resources of Northbrook, Illinois. Its Youngstown-area assets were purchased by Giant Eagle in bankruptcy court.

The case was featured in an episode of the PBS show Frontline, entitled "How to Steal $500 Million".

The stores in the Youngstown area were eventually sold to Marc's, another discount grocery drugstore chain.

References 

 Marianne M. Jennings: "Phar-mor and Michael Monus"
 Marylynne Pitz: "Jury finds Phar-Mor's auditors negligent", Pittsburgh Post-Gazette, 15 February 1996
 "Appeals court rejects convicted executive's request for new trial", The Associated Press, 26 January 2004
 United States v. Monus, decision of appeals court 1997
 Marcus Gleisser: "Not-guilty vote worth $50,000", Plain Dealer (Cleveland, Ohio), 4 March 1998

Retail companies established in 1982
Retail companies disestablished in 2002
Defunct pharmacies of the United States
Companies based in Youngstown, Ohio
Defunct companies based in Ohio
1982 establishments in Ohio
2002 disestablishments in Ohio
Health care companies based in Ohio
Companies that filed for Chapter 11 bankruptcy in 1992
Companies that filed for Chapter 11 bankruptcy in 2001